Carlos Roca may refer to:

Carlos Roca (politician) (born 1946), Peruvian politician
Carlos Roca (field hockey) (1958–2003), Spanish field hockey player
Carlos Roca (footballer) (born 1984), English footballer